Kailaras is a town and a nagar panchayat in Morena district in the Indian state of Madhya Pradesh.The name of the town is related to Kailash mountain due to the Temple of God Shankar,Alopi Shankar Temple which is situated on a hill 490 meters above sea level. The Behara Mata Temple is located near Kailaras. The idol of Goddess Bahrara is present in this temple. Bahara is also known as Pasar Devi and Bharkhandi Sarkar Temple. The city called Pahargarh which was the center of the princely state of Pahargarh is located at a distance of 12 km from Kailaras where the fort of Ishwar and Ishwara Mahadev Temple and Stone Age cave images are present. on the mountain situated in the middle of it

Geography
Kailaras is located at 
. It has an average elevation of 190 metres (623 feet). It is 464 km from Bhopal. The Kawari river passes through the middle of Kailaras. The Sone and Chambal rivers run close to the town. There are several holy temples around Kailaras.

Demographics
According to the Indian census, 
in 2011 Kailaras had a population of 25,920. Males constituted 54% of the population and females 46%. Kailaras had an average literacy rate of 73.9%, higher than the national average of 59.5%: male literacy was 73.9% and female literacy was 58.8%.

Villages of Kailaras 
1.Ancholi
2.Antari
3.Arrahat
4.Arroda
5.Badagaon
6.Badhareta
7.Badwan	
8.Barouli
9.Chamargawa
10.Dipera
11.Dongarpur
12. Golhari
13.Gastoli
14.Pachekha
15.Saipura
16.Semai
17.Shekhpur
18.Simarauda
19.Sujarama
20.Surapura
21.Torika
22.khedator
23.kurroli 24.madhogarh
25.Nepari

References

Cities and towns in Morena district
Morena